The Kent County Brigade was formed as part of the Rhode Island Militia during the American Revolutionary War.  The Brigade was composed of 3 Regiments of 19 Companies from the towns of Warwick, East Greenwich, West Greenwich, and Coventry.

The Regiments were commanded by:

 1st Kent County Regiment (Warwick) under Col. John Waterman

           Replaced by Col. Thomas Holden by May 1778

           Under Lt. Col. Thomas Tillinghast, May 1780

           No officers listed, May 1782

           Under Lt. Col. Job Pierce, May 1783

 2nd Kent County Regiment (West Greenwich) under Col. Stephen Potter

           Replaced by Col. Nathaniel Brown, December 1776

           Replaced by Lt. Col. Archibald Kasson by May 1778 to close of war.

 Kent County Senior Class Regiment under Maj. Samuel Wall, formed May 1780

           Under Maj. Isaac Johnson, May 1781

Composition of the Brigade under Brig. General Thomas Holden in the summer of 1780:

References

Military units and formations of the Continental Army
Rhode Island in the American Revolution